Daniel de Melo Araújo Júnior (born 9 May 2000), known as Daniel Júnior is a Brazilian footballer who plays for Cruzeiro, as a attacking midfielder. He also can play as a left-winger.

Career statistics

Honours
Cruzeiro
 Campeonato Brasileiro Série B: 2022

References

External links
 

2000 births
Living people
People from Santo André, São Paulo
Brazilian footballers
Association football midfielders
Campeonato Brasileiro Série B players
Cruzeiro Esporte Clube players
Footballers from São Paulo (state)